
Year 489 (CDLXXXIX) was a common year starting on Sunday (link will display the full calendar) of the Julian calendar. At the time, it was known as the Year of the Consulship of Probinus and Eusebius (or, less frequently, year 1242 Ab urbe condita). The denomination 489 for this year has been used since the early medieval period, when the Anno Domini calendar era became the prevalent method in Europe for naming years.

Events 
 By place 

 Byzantine Empire 
 Emperor Zeno closes the School of Edessa (modern Turkey) for their teaching of Nestorian doctrine, whereupon the scholars seek refuge at the Syriac Church of the East.  

 Europe 
 The Ostrogoths, led by king Theodoric the Great, invade Northern Italy (at the behest of Eastern Roman Emperor Zeno). The Gepids try to halt the advance, but Theodoric defeats them at the city of Sirmium (Pannonia) and continues on to cross the Julian Alps.
 August 28 – Battle of Isonzo: Theodoric defeats the overwhelming forces of Odoacer at Soča (near Aquileia), forcing his way into Italy.
 September 30 – Battle of Verona: Odoacer is defeated again by Theodoric for a second time. He retreats to the impregnable capital of Ravenna. 
 The Ostrogoths capture the cities Pavia and Milan. The majority of Odoacer's army, including his magister militum Tufa, surrenders to Theodoric.

 By topic 
 Religion 
 The first Temple of Confucius is constructed in Northern China (outside the ancestral temple at Qufu).

Births

Deaths 
 Acacius, patriarch of Constantinople
 Modest, bishop of Trier 
 Sidonius Apollinaris, bishop and diplomat  
 Wang Jian, official of Liu Song and Southern Qi (b. 452)

References